The Sărata is a small river in Vaslui County, Romania. It is a right tributary of the river Gârla Boul Bătrân, which is a right tributary of the Prut.

References

Rivers of Romania
Rivers of Vaslui County